Nermin Čeliković (born 27 November 1980 in Cologne) is a Bosnian-Herzegovinian retired football player.

Club career
Born in Cologne, he has played his entire career in the German lower leagues but had one season in the 2. Bundesliga with Eintracht Braunschweig.

References

External links
 
 Nermin Čeliković Interview

1980 births
Living people
Footballers from Cologne
Association football midfielders
Bosnia and Herzegovina footballers
1. FC Köln II players
Eintracht Braunschweig players
Kickers Emden players
SV Wehen Wiesbaden players
Wuppertaler SV players
Oberliga (football) players
Regionalliga players
2. Bundesliga players
3. Liga players